Ruediger May (born 26 November 1974 in Meerane, Saxony) is a prolific German cruiserweight boxer known for his stinging jab. He challenged once for the WBO world cruiserweight title in 2004.

Professional
As an amateur May boxed in 76 fights, managing to win 55, before turning professional on 26 February 1994 at the age of 19. He boxed his first professional fight in San Jose, California, winning the bout against Fred Simmons, by unanimous decision.

He went on to win his first 24 pro fights before winning the German BDB cruiserweight title on 4 September 1999 with a points victory over Silvio Meinel. This was however followed by his first professional defeat at the hands of Turkish boxer Turan Bagci in Spain. After 2 successful title defenses against Michael Klötzsch and Firat Arslan, May was given a shot at the EBU (European) cruiserweight title in a bout against Ukraine's Alexander Gurov in 2001. Gurov had won the European cruiserweight championship belt from no other than May's brother, Torsten May, that same year. Rudiger lost the bout however by TKO in the 4th round, his second pro defeat.

In 2002 he boxed Alexander Petkovic, with both the WBC International cruiserweight title and German International cruiserweight title at stake. The fight ended in a disappointing draw. In 2003 however May won the vacant EBU-EU (European Union) cruiserweight title with a victory over Frenchman Frédéric Serrat. He managed 3 title defences before being given another shot at the
EBU (European) cruiserweight title in 2004 against the holder Vincenzo Cantatore, a former Italian heavyweight champion and holder of the WBC International cruiserweight title. He boxed to another draw and the belt remained with Cantatore.

That same year May's promoter Wilfried Sauerland secured him a world championship fight with WBO title holder Johnny Nelson. May missed his opportunity though, losing the bout by TKO in the 7th round.

In April 2005 May fought Poland's Krzysztof Wlodarczyk for the vacated EBU-EU (European Union) cruiserweight title but was beaten by knockout in the tenth round. Due to an alleged lack of prospects in professional boxing, May's promoter Sauerland arranged a better matched duel for May against the emerging and then still undefeated Marco Huck. May lost the fight on points over ten rounds.

After a two-year break from boxing, May returned to the ring on 31 March 2007 in a successful comeback fight against Sven Hazel. After two more victories he was handed another world championship fight, this time against WBC International cruiserweight title holder Herbie Hide in March 2008. May lost the bout by technical knockout in the second round, Hide's power proving too much for May, despite his height advantage.

Record

| style="text-align:center;" colspan=8|43 Wins (11 knockouts, 32 decisions), 6 Loss, 3 Draws
|-
!  style="text-align:center; border-style:none none solid solid; background:#e3e3e3;"|Res.
!  style="text-align:center; border-style:none none solid solid; background:#e3e3e3;"|Opponent
!  style="text-align:center; border-style:none none solid solid; background:#e3e3e3;"|Type
!  style="text-align:center; border-style:none none solid solid; background:#e3e3e3;"|Rd.
!  style="text-align:center; border-style:none none solid solid; background:#e3e3e3;"|Date
!  style="text-align:center; border-style:none none solid solid; background:#e3e3e3;"|Venue
!  style="text-align:center; border-style:none none solid solid; background:#e3e3e3;"|Location
!  style="text-align:center; border-style:none none solid solid; background:#e3e3e3;"|Notes
|-
| Loss
| Herbie Hide
|TKO
|2
|11 March 2008
|Maritim Hotel
| Halle an der Saale, Germany
|
|-
| Win
| Jevgenijs Andrejevs
|Decision 
|6
|17 November 2007
|Sporthalle "Neue Zeit"
| Schwedt, Germany
|
|-
| Win
| Dzemail Skrijeli
|KO
|3
|7 July 2007
|Kölnarena
| Cologne, Germany
|
|-
| Win
| Sven Haselhuhn
|TKO
|6
|31 March 2007
|Olympiahalle
| Munich, Germany
|
|-
| Loss
| Marco Huck
|Decision 
|10
|3 September 2005
|International Congress Center
| Charlottenburg, Berlin, Germany
|
|-
| Loss
| Krzysztof Wlodarczyk
|KO
|10
|16 April 2005
|
| Bydgoszcz, Poland
|
|-
| Win
| Roman Bugaj
|Decision 
|8
|4 December 2004
|Estrel Convention Center
| Neukölln, Berlin, Germany
|
|-
| Loss
| Johnny Nelson
|TKO
|7
|4 September 2004
|Grugahalle
| Essen, Germany
|
|-
|style="background:#abcdef;"|Draw
| Vincenzo Cantatore
|Draw
|12
|5 June 2004
|Chemnitz Arena
| Chemnitz, Germany
|
|-
| Win
| Nate Zeikle
|KO
|2
|28 February 2004
|Mehrzweckhalle
| Dresden, Germany
|
|-
|style="background:#abcdef;"|Draw
| Vincenzo Rossitto
|Draw
|10
|22 November 2003
|Erdgas Arena
| Riesa, Germany
|
|-
| Win
| Alain Simon
|Decision
|10
|6 September 2003
|Messehalle
| Erfurt, Germany
|
|-
| Win
| Ismail Abdoul
|Decision
|10
|31 May 2003
|Brandenburg Halle
| Frankfurt, Germany
|
|-
| Win
| Frédéric Serrat
|TD
|7
|15 March 2003
|Max Schmeling Halle
| Berlin, Germany
|
|-
| Win
| Eric French
|TKO
|4
|1 February 2003
|Chemnitz Arena
| Chemnitz, Germany
|
|-
|style="background:#abcdef;"|Draw
| Alexander Petkovic
|Draw
|12
|20 July 2002
|Westfalenhalle
| Dortmund, Germany
|
|-
| Win
| Vage Kocharyan
|Decision 
|8
|27 April 2002
|Sachsen Arena
| Riesa, Germany
|
|-
| Win
| Vladislav Druso
|Decision 
|8
|9 March 2002
|Brandenburg Halle
| Frankfurt, Germany
|
|-
| Loss
| Alexander Gurov
|TKO
|4
|1 December 2001
|Westfalenhalle
| Dortmund, Germany
|
|-
| Win
| Mohamed Ali Bouraoui
|TKO
|2
|1 September 2001
|Bördelandhalle
| Magdeburg, Germany
|
|-
| Win
| Firat Arslan
|Decision 
|10
|19 May 2001
|Maritim Hotel
| Cologne, Germany
|
|-
| Win
| Henry Mobio
|Decision
|8
|24 March 2001
|Bördelandhalle
| Magdeburg, Germany
|
|-
| Win
| Lee Manuel Ossie
|Decision
|12
|27 January 2001
|Sachsen Arena
| Riesa, Germany
|
|-
| Win
| Mohamed Ali Bouraoui
|Decision
|8
|16 December 2000
|Europahalle
| Karlsruhe, Germany
|
|-
| Win
| Michael Kloetzsch
|TKO
|3
|2 September 2000
|Bördelandhalle
| Magdeburg, Germany
|
|-
| Win
| Darron Griffiths
|Decision
|8
|6 May 2000
|Ballsporthalle
| Frankfurt, Germany
|
|-
| Loss
| Turan Bagci
|Decision
|8
|2 November 1999
|
| Ciudad Real, Spain
|
|-
| Win
| Silvio Meinel
|Decision
|10
|4 September 1999
|
| Meinsdorf, Brandenburg, Germany
|
|-
| Win
| Francis Fofoh
|Decision
|8
|8 May 1999
|Philipshalle
| Düsseldorf, Germany
|
|-
| Win
| Nigel Rafferty
|Decision
|8
|27 February 1999
|Max-Schmeling-Halle
| Berlin, Prenzlauer Berg, Germany
|
|-
| Win
| Matthew Charleston
|Decision
|6
|5 December 1998
|
| Cologne, Germany
|
|-
| Win
| Geert Blieck
|Decision
|6
|10 October 1998
|
| Vienna, Austria
|
|-
| Win
| Marco van Spaendonck
|Decision
|6
|23 March 1998
|Max-Schmeling-Halle
| Berlin, Prenzlauer Berg, Germany
|
|-
| Win
| Peter Hrivnak
|Decision
|6
|6 December 1997
|
| Neuwied, Germany
|
|-
| Win
| Stephen Brown
|Decision
|6
|5 October 1997
|
| Gera, Germany
|
|-
| Win
| Simon McDougall
|Decision
|6
|1 June 1997
|
| Riesa, Germany
|
|-
| Win
| Jerry Halstead
|Decision
|6
|26 April 1997
|
| Leipzig, Germany
|
|-
| Win
| Dan Kosmicki
|Decision
|6
|22 March 1997
|Max-Schmeling-Halle
| Berlin, Prenzlauer Berg, Germany
|
|-
| Win
| Mike McGrady
|Decision
|6
|7 December 1996
|
| Vienna, Austria
|
|-
| Win
| Albert Call
|Decision
|6
|19 October 1996
|Zoo-Gesellschaftshaus
| Frankfurt, Germany
|
|-
| Win
| Tim St Clair
|TKO
|5
|25 May 1996
|Neue Messehallen
| Leipzig, Germany
|
|-
| Win
| Slavomir Selicky
|Decision
|6
|20 April 1996
|
| Düsseldorf, Germany
|
|-
| Win
| Carlos Vásquez
|KO
|2
|23 March 1996
|Madison Square Garden
| New York City, United States
|
|-
| Win
| Ed Mosley
|KO
|2
|17 February 1996
|Westfalenhalle
| Dortmund, Germany
|
|-
| Win
| Cliff Elden
|Decision
|6
|29 January 1996
|Café Royal
|Piccadilly, London, United Kingdom
|
|-
| Win
| Scott Lindecker
|KO
|1
|3 November 1995
|Zoo-Gesellschaftshaus
| Frankfurt, Germany
|
|-
| Win
| Sean Gibbons
|KO
|4
|9 September 1995
|Seidenstickerhalle
| Bielefeld, Germany
|
|-
| Win
| John Keeton
|Decision 
|6
|11 February 1995
|Festhalle Frankfurt
| Frankfurt, Germany
|
|-
| Win
| Steve Osborne
|Decision
|6
|26 November 1994
|
| Wuppertal, Germany
|
|-
| Win
| Art Stacey
|Decision
|6
|8 October 1994
|Gerry Weber Stadion
| Halle, North Rhine-Westphalia, Germany
|
|-
| Win
| Nicky Wadman
|Decision
|4
|17 September 1994
|
| Leverkusen, Germany
|
|-
| Win
| Fred Simmons
|Decision 
|4
|26 February 1994
|The Event Center Arena
| San Jose, United States
|

Other Information
His brother is Torsten May, who was also a boxer.

In 2008 May spent a period of time as David Haye's sparring partner in Hayes preparation for his title defence fight with Enzo Maccarinelli and May's preparation for his world championship showdown with Herbie Hide.

References

External links
 

1974 births
Living people
People from Meerane
German male boxers
Cruiserweight boxers
Sportspeople from Saxony